Haiti will participate in the 2011 Parapan American Games.

Athletics

Haiti will send three male athletes to compete.

Cycling

Haiti will send one male athlete to compete in the road cycling tournament.

Nations at the 2011 Parapan American Games
2011 in Haitian sport
Haiti at the Pan American Games